People Power: the Game of Civil Resistance is a single-player turn-based strategy game which allows the player to take on the role of the leader of a nonviolent movement.  It is the second video game focused on civil resistance and nonviolent conflict from filmmaker Steve York and the International Center on Nonviolent Conflict. The game was released in 2010.  It is playable on PCs, Macs and Linux.  Ivan Marovic, one of the leaders of the student movement, Otpor! (Resistance!) was the core systems engineer for this game.

The game has a file size of 44MB and is available only by download. The game runs on Adobe AIR which must be installed prior to installing the game.

The tutorial scenario simulates a pro-environmental campaign.  The game also comes with a scenario builder, a free app which allows the player to design original scenarios to play based on historical struggles, fictional situations, or present-day ongoing civil resistance struggles, anywhere in the world.

People Power: the Game of Civil Resistance falls under the category of serious games.

References

External links
 Official website

2010 video games
Educational video games
Civil disobedience
Linux games
MacOS games
Turn-based strategy video games
Video games developed in the United States
Windows games